West Bradford is a village and civil parish in Lancashire, England, 27 miles (43 km) west of the larger city of Bradford, West Yorkshire and 2.5 miles (4 km) north of Clitheroe. The population of the civil parish taken at the 2011 census was 788. It covers some 2000 acres of the Forest of Bowland.  In Domesday, it is recorded as Bradeford and in the thirteenth century, Braford in Bouland.  It was part of the West Riding of Yorkshire until 1974. "West Bradford" was introduced in the nineteenth century at the time of the introduction of postal services to help distinguish the village from its larger eastern neighbour of the same name.

Along with Waddington, Grindleton and Sawley the parish forms the Waddington and West Bradford ward of Ribble Valley Borough Council.

History

Since the fourteenth century, West Bradford has formed part of the Liberty of Slaidburn.  In turn, Slaidburn was part of the ancient Lordship of Bowland which comprised a Royal Forest and a Liberty of ten manors spanning eight townships and four parishes and covered an area of almost  on the historic borders of Lancashire and Yorkshire. The manors within the Liberty were Slaidburn (Newton-in-Bowland, West Bradford, Grindleton), Knowlmere, Waddington, Easington, Bashall Eaves, Mitton, Withgill (Crook), Leagram (Bowland-with-Leagram), Hammerton and Dunnow (Battersby).

Mahatma Gandhi stayed here (Heys Farm Guest House) in 1931 when he came to visit the cotton mills of Lancashire.

Media gallery

See also

Listed buildings in West Bradford, Lancashire

References

External links

Villages in Lancashire
Civil parishes in Lancashire
Geography of Ribble Valley
History of Yorkshire
Forest of Bowland